Ras GTPase-activating protein-binding protein 1 is an enzyme that in humans is encoded by the G3BP1 gene.

This gene encodes one of the DNA-unwinding enzymes which prefers partially unwound 3'-tailed substrates and can also unwind partial RNA/DNA and RNA/RNA duplexes in an ATP-dependent fashion. This enzyme is a member of the heterogeneous nuclear RNA-binding proteins and is also an element of the Ras signal transduction pathway. It was originally reported to bind specifically to the Ras-GTPase-activating protein by associating with its SH3 domain, but this interaction has recently been challenged. Several alternatively spliced transcript variants of this gene have been described, but the full-length nature of some of these variants has not been determined.

G3BP1 can initiate stress granule formation and labeled G3BP1 is commonly used as a marker for stress granules.

Interactions
G3BP1 has been shown to interact with USP10.
It also interacts with SND1[5].

References

[5]Gao X, Ge L, Shao J, Su C, Zhao H, Saarikettu J, Yao X, Yao Z, Silvennoinen O, Yang J., Tudor-SN interacts with and co-localizes with G3BP in stress granules under stress conditions.FEBS Letters, Volume 584, Issue 16, Pages 3525-3532.

Further reading

External links